Valentín Burgoa (born 16 August 2000) is an Argentine professional footballer who plays as a midfielder for Godoy Cruz.

Career
Burgoa began his career with Godoy Cruz. He was promoted into their senior squad towards the end of the 2017–18 Argentine Primera División season, appearing on the bench in April 2018 versus Banfield prior to making his professional debut at the age of eighteen in a 2–0 win over Tigre on the final day as Godoy Cruz finished second.

Career statistics
.

References

External links

2000 births
Living people
Sportspeople from Mendoza Province
Argentine footballers
Association football midfielders
Argentine Primera División players
Godoy Cruz Antonio Tomba footballers